Michael R. McLane is a judge on the 22nd Circuit Court of Oregon and a former Republican politician in the state's Legislature. McLane resigned his seat representing House District 55 in the Oregon House of Representatives on July 1, 2019. He was appointed to the circuit court bench by  Democratic Governor Kate Brown.

Early life and career
Born in Condon, Oregon, McLane graduated from Condon High School in 1983, and then from Oregon State University with a degree in Agricultural Resource Economics in 1987.

He earned a Juris Doctor degree from Lewis & Clark Law School and clerked for Justice W. Michael Gillette at the Oregon Supreme Court. McLane also worked as a law clerk at the U.S. Attorney's office and has assisted with prosecutions in Multnomah County Circuit Court, as well as federal court. He worked at the law firms Stoel Rives and Miller Nash, before co-founding Lynch, Conger McLane in 2016. McLane also has experience serving as a circuit judge pro tem in Deschutes County, Oregon.

McLane co-founded a publishing company that produced the Flying Rhino children's book series, which led to the Flying Rhino Junior High Saturday morning cartoon series.

Political career
McLane was elected to the Oregon House in 2010 and was re-elected in 2012, 2014, 2016 and 2018. He served as the Republican Leader in the Oregon House from January 2013 to January 2019. He stepped down from the leadership position after the November 2018 elections, but retained his seat. He resigned from the House on July 1, 2019 to take an appointment from Governor Kate Brown as a circuit court judge for Crook and Jefferson counties.

Military career
McLane currently serves as a lieutenant colonel in the Oregon Air National Guard. He previously served as an Oregon Air Guardsman at the 173rd Fighter Wing at Kingsley Field, an F-15 training base in Klamath Falls. Prior to his service in the Oregon Air Guard, McLane was an officer in the 41st Infantry Brigade in the Oregon Army National Guard.

Personal
McLane, his wife Holly, and their three children live on a small farm in Powell Butte, near Bend.

References

External links
 Campaign website
 Legislative website
 Project VoteSmart biography

21st-century American politicians
American book publishers (people)
Lewis & Clark Law School alumni
Living people
Republican Party members of the Oregon House of Representatives
Oregon lawyers
People from Powell Butte, Oregon
People from Gilliam County, Oregon
Year of birth missing (living people)